The Acton Institute for the Study of Religion and Liberty is an American research and educational institution, or think tank, in Grand Rapids, Michigan, (with an office in Rome) whose stated mission is "to promote a free and virtuous society characterized by individual liberty and sustained by religious principles". Its work supports free market economic policy framed within Judeo-Christian morality. It has been alternately described as conservative and libertarian. Acton Institute also organizes seminars "to educate religious leaders of all denominations, business executives, entrepreneurs, university professors, and academic researchers in economics principles."

History

The Acton Institute was founded in 1990 in Grand Rapids, Michigan by Robert A. Sirico and Kris Alan Mauren. It is named after the English historian, politician and writer Lord Acton, who is popularly associated with the dictum "Power tends to corrupt, and absolute power corrupts absolutely". Sirico and Mauren were concerned that many religious people were ignorant of economic realities, and that many economists and businessmen were insufficiently grounded in religious principles. Sirico explains the essential link between economics and religion with reference to the institute's namesake:

The release in 1991 of the papal encyclical Centesimus annus buoyed the institute at a critical time. The document provided, a year after Acton's founding, established support for the institute's economic personalism and defense of capitalism. Robert Sirico said at the time that it constituted a "vindication".

In 2002, the institute opened a Rome office, Istituto Acton, to carry out Acton's mission abroad. In 2004, the institute was given the Templeton Freedom Award for its "extensive body of work on the moral defense of the free market". In 2012, the Think Tanks and Civil Societies Program at the University of Pennsylvania included Acton in its list of the top 50 think tanks in the United States.

In 2005, Mother Jones published a chart which included the Acton Institute on a list of groups that had reportedly received a donation ($155,000) from ExxonMobil. As of 2007, the institute had received funding from the Earhart Foundation and the Bradley Foundation. The Grand Rapids Press wrote in 2013 that much of the Acton Institute's funding comes from residents of western Michigan, including John Kennedy, president and CEO of Autocam Corp., and Amway co-founder Richard DeVos.

Affiliations
The Acton Institute is a member of the State Policy Network, a network of free-market oriented think tanks in the United States.

The Acton Institute has built a network of international affiliations including Centro Interdisciplinar de Ética e Economia Personalista, Brazil, Europa Institut, Austria, Institute for the Study of Human Dignity and Economic Freedom, Zambia and Instituto Acton Argentina Organization.

Research and publications
From its guiding principles and economic research, the institute publishes books, papers, and periodicals, and maintains a media outreach effort.
 Journal of Markets & Morality:
Peer-reviewed journal that explores the intersection of economics and morality from scientific and theological points of view. Published semi-annually.
 Monographs:
In-depth treatments of specific policy issues and translations of scholarly works previously unpublished in English.
 Abraham Kuyper Translation Project:
In 2011, the institute began a collaboration with Kuyper College to translate into English the three-volume work Common Grace (De Gemene Gratie in Dutch) of politician, journalist and Reformed theologian Abraham Kuyper. The work, written from 1901-05 while he was Prime minister of the Netherlands, addresses the advance of both Marxism and libertarianism from an ecumenical Christian viewpoint as part of an effort to build a "constructive public theology" for the Western world. The first volume of the translation, Wisdom and Wonder: Common Grace in Science and Art, was unveiled in November, 2011.
 Religion & Liberty:
Quarterly publication which covers the interworking of liberty and morality: contains interviews, book reviews, scholarly essays, brief biographies of central thinkers, and discussions of important topics.
 The Samaritan Guide:
Through 2008, the institute gave an annual Samaritan Award to a "highly successful, privately funded charity whose work is direct, personal, and accountable". The Samaritan Guide was produced to encourage effective charitable giving by establishing a rating system for charities considered for the Samaritan Award.
 Acton Notes:
The bimonthly newsletter of the Acton Institute; contains reports of projects and goings on at the institute.
 The Acton PowerBlog:

Since April 2005 the institute has provided a synthesis of religion and economics on its blog.

Films

Films produced by the Acton Institute include The Call of the Entrepreneur (2007) and Poverty, Inc. (2014), which won a 2014 Templeton Freedom Award from the Atlas Network. Poverty Inc. is part of the Acton Institute's PovertyCure initiative, which seeks to create solutions to poverty by "moving efforts from aid to enterprise and from paternalism to partnerships."

The Call of the Entrepreneur 
The Call of the Entrepreneur was produced along with Cold Water Media. It premiered in Grand Rapids, Michigan, US on May 17, 2007.

Synopsis 
The main subjects of the documentary are Brad Morgan, Frank Hanna, and Jimmy Lai. Morgan, a dairy farmer from Evart, Michigan discusses his journey from a struggling dairy farmer to the owner and operator of a million-dollar composting operation. Hanna, a merchant banker in New York City who originally hails from Georgia, explains how financial engineering not only makes credit more widely available to entrepreneurs today but also played a crucial role in the discovery of America. Lai talks about his childhood in Communist China and his move at twelve years old to Hong Kong. There, he founded Giordano, a retail outlet, and later Next Media. Lai explains that entrepreneurs, when taking risks, are "dashing into hope."

The documentary also contains information from experts in the field of economics, including Rev. Robert Sirico, founder and president of the Acton Institute, Samuel Gregg, Jay Richards, George Gilder, and Michael Novak.

Critical reception 
The reception of the film was mixed in limited reviews. Entrepreneur called it "a non-stop barrage of uplifting tales" and wrote that Morgan's story was "inspiring" and "enough to remind you that our society thrives on entrepreneurial ideas." Fortune Small Business was more negative, writing, "With no critical analysis, few sources cited outside of the Acton Institute, and no concrete counter-examples examined, it's difficult to see the documentary as anything more than an infomercial for Acton's libertarian religious doctrine aimed at those already inclined to agree with it."

Personnel
Besides Sirico, notable scholars associated with the institute include Anthony Bradley, Jordan Ballor, Stephen Grabill, Michael Matheson Miller, Marvin Olasky, Kevin Schmiesing, and Jonathan Witt. The institute's director of research is Samuel Gregg, author of the prize-winning book The Commercial Society. Andreas Widmer is a research fellow in entrepreneurship for the research department.

Current and former members of the institute's board of directors include Alejandro Chafuen, former president of the Atlas Network; Gaylen Byker, president emeritus of Calvin College; Sean Fieler, Equinox Partners; Leslie Graves, president of the Lucy Burns Institute; Frank Hanna III of Hanna Capital; and Robert Sirico, president of the Acton Institute.

Assets
As of 2018 the Acton Institute had total assets of $16,064,623.

Funding details
Funding details as of 2018:

See also

 State Policy Network
 Think Tanks and Civil Societies Program
 Earhart Foundation
 Bradley Foundation

References

External links
 Acton Institute web site
 Organizational Profile – National Center for Charitable Statistics (Urban Institute)

 
Political and economic think tanks in the United States
Conservative organizations in the United States
Think tanks established in 1990
Religion in Grand Rapids, Michigan
Christianity in Michigan
Non-profit organizations based in Michigan
Organizations based in Grand Rapids, Michigan
Libertarian organizations based in the United States
Liberalism and religion
Christian organizations